The Hynes Award is awarded by the Society for Freshwater Science and recognizes an excellent academic research paper in the freshwater sciences by a scientist less than five years after their terminal graduate degree (usually, a doctorate). Recipients of the award have gone on to become leading senior researchers, serving as science advisors to various governments and states, and held leadership positions in national and international scientific societies.

The award is named after H.B. Noel Hynes, a British biologist who worked at the University of Liverpool and the University of Waterloo, where he was a world-leading expert on freshwater invertebrates and ecology.

Recipients

References 

Lists of award winners
American science and technology awards
Awards established in 2000